José Bianco (1908–1986) was an Argentine essayist, translator, and writer. Bianco made translations of works by Henry James, Jean-Paul Sartre, Julien Benda, and Ambrose Bierce, among others.

Bianco began his career with El Límite in 1929, and later he published Little Gyaros in 1932 for which he won the Jockey Club (Buenos Aires) Award

Bianco served as a secretary of Sur (magazine) for 23 years. From 1961 to 1967, he worked with Editorial Universitaria de Buenos Aires in Buenos Aires

References

1908 births
1986 deaths
Argentine essayists
Male essayists
Argentine translators
English–Spanish translators
French–Spanish translators
20th-century translators
20th-century essayists
20th-century Argentine male writers